The Online Pornography (Commercial Basis) Regulations 2019 is a statutory instrument issued under the powers given by the Digital Economy Act 2017. It defines the criteria to determine which websites would have been required to implement an age verification scheme, as part of the proposed UK Internet age verification system, the implementation of which was eventually abandoned in October 2019.

Definition 
For the purpose of the regulations, a site is defined as making pornographic material available on a commercial basis for the purposes of the Act if:

 the pornographic material is available only as paid content or
 the pornographic material is available for free, but those posting the material are (or reasonably expect to be) remunerated and 
 the age-verification regulator cannot reasonably assume less than one third of the site's content is pornographic or
 the site is advertised as a pornographic site

The government's explanatory notes to the draft regulations laid before Parliament in 2018 note that "the focus of the legislation should be pornographic websites, rather than popular social media platforms on which pornographic material is only a small part of the overall content".

Implementation 

The British Board of Film Classification was appointed as the age-verification regulator in 2018.

After numerous false starts, the government abandoned the scheme. On 16 October 2019, the culture secretary Nicky Morgan stated that the government had abandoned the mandate altogether, in favour of replacing it with a forthcoming wider scheme of Internet regulation.

See also 
 Censorship in the United Kingdom

References

External links 
 The Online Pornography (Commercial Basis) Regulations 2019 at Legislation.gov.uk

Statutory Instruments of the United Kingdom
2019 in British law
United Kingdom pornography law
Censorship of pornography
Age verification